Interpersonal psychotherapy (IPT) is a brief, attachment-focused psychotherapy that centers on resolving interpersonal problems and symptomatic recovery. It is an empirically supported treatment (EST) that follows a highly structured and time-limited approach and is intended to be completed within 12–16 weeks. IPT is based on the principle that relationships and life events impact mood and that the reverse is also true. It was developed by Gerald Klerman and Myrna Weissman for major depression in the 1970s and has since been adapted for other mental disorders. IPT is an empirically validated intervention for depressive disorders, and is more effective when used in combination with psychiatric medications. Along with cognitive behavioral therapy (CBT), IPT is recommended in treatment guidelines as a psychosocial treatment of choice for depression.

History
Originally named "high contact" therapy, IPT was first developed in 1969 at Yale University as part of a study designed by Gerald Klerman, Myrna Weissman and colleagues to test the efficacy of an antidepressant with and without psychotherapy as maintenance treatment of depression. IPT has been studied in many research protocols since its development. NIMH-TDCRP demonstrated the efficacy of IPT as a maintenance treatment and delineated some contributing factors.

Foundations
IPT was influenced by CBT as well as psychodynamic approaches. It takes its structure from CBT in that it is time-limited, employs structured interviews and assessment tools. In general, however, IPT focuses directly on affects, or feelings, whereas CBT focuses on cognitions with strong associated affects. Unlike CBT, IPT makes no attempt to uncover distorted thoughts systematically by giving homework or other assignments, nor does it help the patient develop alternative thought patterns through prescribed practice. Rather, as evidence arises during the course of therapy, the therapist calls attention to distorted thinking in relation to significant others. The goal is to change the relationship pattern rather than associated depressive cognitions, which are acknowledged as depressive symptoms.

The content of IPT's therapy was inspired by Attachment theory and Harry Stack Sullivan's Interpersonal psychoanalysis. Social theory is also influenced in a lesser role to emphasis on qualitative impact of social support networks for recovery. Unlike psychodynamic approaches, IPT does not include a personality theory or attempt to conceptualize or treat personality but focuses on humanistic applications of interpersonal sensitivity.
 Attachment Theory, forms the basis for understanding patients' relationship difficulties, attachment schema and optimal functioning when attachment needs are met.
 Interpersonal Theory, describes the ways in which patients' maladaptive metacommunication patterns (Low to high Affiliation & Inclusion and dominant to submissive Status) lead to or evoke difficulty in their here-and-now interpersonal relationships.

The aim of IPT is to help the patient to improve interpersonal and intrapersonal communication skills within relationships and to develop social support network with realistic expectations to deal with the crises precipitated in distress and to weather 'interpersonal storms'.

Clinical applications
It has been demonstrated to be an effective treatment for depression and has been modified to treat other psychiatric disorders such as substance use disorders and eating disorders. It is incumbent upon the therapist in the treatment to quickly establish a therapeutic alliance with positive countertransference of warmth, empathy, affective attunement and positive regard for encouraging a positive transferential relationship, from which the patient is able to seek help from the therapist despite resistance. It is primarily used as a short-term therapy completed in 12–16 weeks, but it has also been used as a maintenance therapy for patients with recurrent depression. A shorter, 6-week therapy suited to primary care settings called Interpersonal counselling (IPC) has been derived from IPT.

Interpersonal psychotherapy has been found to be an effective treatment for the following:
 Bipolar disorder
 Bulimia nervosa
 Major depressive disorder
 Post-partum depression

Adolescents
Although originally developed as an individual therapy for adults, IPT has been modified for use with adolescents and older adults.

IPT for children is based on the premise that depression occurs in the context of an individual's relationships regardless of its origins in biology or genetics. More specifically, depression affects people's relationships and these relationships further affect our mood. The IPT model identifies four general areas in which a person may be having relationship difficulties: 

 grief after the loss of a loved one;
 conflict in significant relationships, including a client's relationship with his or her own self; 
 difficulties adapting to changes in relationships or life circumstances; and
 difficulties stemming from social isolation.

The IPT therapist helps identify areas in need of skill-building to improve the client's relationships and decrease the depressive symptoms. Over time, the client learns to link changes in mood to events occurring in his/her relationships, communicate feelings and expectations for the relationships, and problem-solve solutions to difficulties in the relationships.

IPT has been adapted for the treatment of depressed adolescents (IPT-A) to address developmental issues most common to teenagers such as separation from parents, development of romantic relationships, and initial experience with death of a relative or friend. IPT-A helps the adolescent identify and develop more adaptive methods for dealing with the interpersonal issues associated with the onset or maintenance of their depression. IPT-A is typically a 12- to 16-week treatment. Although the treatment involves primarily individual sessions with the teenager, parents are asked to participate in a few sessions to receive education about depression, to address any relationship difficulties that may be occurring between the adolescent and his/her parents, and to help support the adolescent's treatment.

Elderly
IPT has been used as a psychotherapy for depressed elderly, with its emphasis on addressing interpersonally relevant problems. IPT appears especially well suited to the life changes that many people experience in their later years.

References

Sources
 

Psychotherapies